The Lola T390 is a 2-litre Sports 2000 prototype race car, designed, developed and built by British manufacturer Lola, for 2-litre sports car racing, in 1975.

References

Sports prototypes
T390